Cephalocassis is a genus of sea catfishes found along the coasts and in rivers and lakes of southern Asia from India to Malaysia. There are currently four described species in this genus.

Species
 Cephalocassis borneensis (Bleeker, 1851)
 Cephalocassis jatia (F. Hamilton, 1822) (River catfish)
 Cephalocassis manillensis (Valenciennes, 1840)
 Cephalocassis melanochir (Bleeker, 1852)

References
 

Ariidae
Fish of Asia
Catfish genera
Taxa named by Pieter Bleeker